Steve Press (born April 15, 1946) was an American politician in the state of Florida.

Press was born in Washington and came to Florida in 1962. An attorney, he served in the Florida House of Representatives for the 86th district from 1982 to 1992, as a Democrat.

References

Living people
1946 births
Democratic Party members of the Florida House of Representatives